The Canadian Council on Africa (CCAfrica) was created on May 27, 2002 and is currently located in Ottawa, Ontario, with the goal of becoming Canada's leading organization committed to the economic development of a modern competitive Africa. CCAfrica was founded as a result of the Kananaskis G8 Summit, where the agenda included the development of a self-help plan for Africa. Formed a year after The New Partnership for African Development (NEPAD), CCAfrica shares NEPAD's goal of African renewal.

Membership and member services

CCAfrica is a non-profit organization dedicated to Africa's economic development. The organization has over 150 members representing every sector of the economy: education, engineering, infrastructure, natural resources, energy, finance, legal, consulting, communications, information technology, manufacture, agri-food, environment, sustainable development, and health. In addition to active members, CCAfrica has associate members, such as the Canadian International Development Agency (CIDA), and affiliated African members, such as Nigerian Economic Summit Group (NESG) and the Tanzania Chamber of Commerce, Industry and Agriculture (TCCIA).

Many services are provided for members of CCAfrica. A notable service is the Business Development Service (BDS), a weekly publication sent out to members with relevant African business opportunities in their sector. CCAfrica also lobbies on behalf of and represents their members in dealings with the government. A great number of publications are also available to members, including newsletters, reports, briefing notes, the Africa News Clipping Service, and the Monthly African Indicators. In addition, members become part of a network of organizations that are players in the economic development of Africa, can be assisted in obtaining business visas, and are kept informed of various updates that can affect their business dealings in Africa.

Activities and events

CCAfrica holds conferences, seminars, and briefings throughout Canada. The themes of these events range from natural resources and the economy to education and the Francophonie. All of these events seek to provide information to both members and non-members about business and development in Africa.

In addition to conferences and seminars, CCAfrica also hosts political and business delegations from African countries. Furthermore, CCAfrica leads Canadian business delegations to African countries. These help to promote business relations between Canadian businesses and institutions and their African counterparts.

Board of directors

Members

Maritimes
Michael Wyse, Black Business Initiative

Québec
Michel Côté, CRC Sogema
Yvon Bernier, DID
Robert Blackburn, SNC-Lavalin
Amina Gerba, Afrique Expansion Mag
Pierre Boivin, McCarthy Tétrault
Simon Lafrance, STRATEGEUM

Ontario
David Ireland, Canadian Bank Note
David Baron, Cowater
Marc Sitter, Sherritt International
Matt Fisher, Anyway Env. Solutions
Peter Kieran, CPCS
Nola Kianza, CCAfrica
Alanna Heath, Barrick
Andrew McAlister, McAlister Consulting Corp.
Charles Field-Marsham, Kestrel Capital
Marie-Jose Fortin, ACCC

Western Canada
Wayne Dunn, CSR Resources
Denis Painchaud, Nexen
Neil Sadler, IRD
David Gamble, IMW
John Treleaven, Mercy Ships Canada

Advisors

Diane Belliveau, EDC
James Hill, DFAIT
Shane Jaffer, Government of Alberta
Alain Carrier, MDEIE

Canadian offices
There are four CCAfrica offices across Canada: the President's Office, located in Ottawa (Ontario), with regional offices located in Toronto (Ontario), Montreal (Quebec) and Calgary (Alberta).

References

Non-profit organizations based in Ottawa
Development charities based in Canada